The Mission Grapefruiters were a minor league baseball team based in Mission, Texas. The Grapefruiters played as members of the Class D level Gulf Coast League in 1926 and Texas Valley League from 1927 to 1928, winning the 1927 league pennant.

History
The "Mission Grapefruiters" were formed in 1926, during the season. On July 16, 1926, the Kingsville Jerseys of the Class D level Gulf Coast League, relocated to Mission, Texas. Kingsville had a 14–26 record at the time of the move. The Kingsville/Mission team ended the season with an overall record of 46–52, after compiling a record of 32–26 while based in Mission. The team placed 3rd in the four–team league under managers Tom Deering, Fred Paschal and Ed Marburger, finishing 12.0 games behind the 1st place Laredo Oilers in the final standings.

The "Grapefruiters" moniker corresponded to local industry, as Mission, Texas has long been home to agriculture and citrus juice production.

The Mission Grapefruiters continued play in a newly named league in 1927. The Texas Valley League formed as a four–team Class D level league, evolving from the 1926 Gulf Coast League, with the Corpus Christi Seahawks, Edinburg Bobcats, Laredo Oilers and Mission Grapefruits continuing play, as all four teams had finished the previous season as the only members of the 1926 Gulf Coast League. The Texas Valley League began play on April 5, 1927 with Mission playing at Laredo. The Mission Grapefruiters had the best overall regular season record, but the team missed the playoffs due to a split–season schedule in the league. With a record of 62–55, Mission placed 1st in the overall standings under manager Ed Marburger. However, Mission missed the playoffs as the Corpus Christi Seahawks won the first–half standings and Laredo won the second–half standings. In the Final, Corpus Christi Swept Laredo in three games.

The Mission Grapefruiters played their final season in 1928. The Texas Valley League continued play as a four–team league as Mission and the Corpus Christi Seahawks were joined by teams from Brownsville, Texas and McAllen, Texas in the Class D level league. The 1928 season standings are unknown. The Texas Valley League permanently folded after the 1928 season.

Mission, Texas has not hosted another minor league team.

The ballpark
The name of the Mission Grapefruiters' minor league home ballpark is not known.

Timeline

Year–by–year records

Notable alumni
Les Mallon (1927)

See also
Mission Grapefruiters players

References

External links
 Baseball Reference

Defunct minor league baseball teams
Professional baseball teams in Texas
Defunct baseball teams in Texas
Baseball teams established in 1926
Baseball teams disestablished in 1928
Mission, Texas
Florida Complex League teams
Texas Valley League teams
1928 disestablishments in Texas
Hidalgo County, Texas